The Kama Reservoir, also known as the Perm Reservoir, is a reservoir formed by the dam of the Kama Hydroelectric Station near Perm (constructed in 1954-1956). The Kama Reservoir has a surface area of 1,915 km² and a water volume of 12,2 cubic km. Its length along the Kama is 272 km, major width - up to 30 km, average depth - 6,3 m (with maximum depth equaling 30 m). The Kama Reservoir was created for the benefit of transportation, energetics, and water supply. It also performs seasonal flow regulation. The cities of Perm, Dobryanka, Chyormoz, Berezniki, Usolye, and Solikamsk are located on the shores of the Kama Reservoir.

Reservoirs in Russia
Reservoirs in Perm Krai
RKama